The Tauc–Lorentz model is a mathematical formula for the frequency dependence of the complex-valued relative permittivity, sometimes referred to as the dielectric function. The model has been used to fit the complex refractive index of amorphous semiconductor materials at frequencies greater than their optical band gap. The dispersion relation bears the names of Jan Tauc and Hendrik Lorentz, whose previous works were combined by G. E. Jellison and F. A. Modine to create the model. The model was inspired, in part, by shortcomings of the Forouhi–Bloomer model, which is aphysical due to its incorrect asymptotic behavior and non-Hermitian character. Despite the inspiration, the Tauc–Lorentz model is itself aphysical due to being non-Hermitian and non-analytic in the upper half-plane.
Further researchers have modified the model to address these shortcomings.

Mathematical formulation 
The general form of the model is given by

where
  is the relative permittivity,
  is the photon energy (related to the angular frequency by ),
  is the value of the relative permittivity at infinite energy,
  is related to the electric susceptibility.

Mathematically, they are given by
 
 
where
  is a fitting parameter related to the strength of the Lorentzian oscillator,
  is a fitting parameter related to the broadening of the Lorentzian oscillator,
  is a fitting parameter related to the resonant frequency of the Lorentzian oscillator,
  is a fitting parameter related to the bandgap of the material.

Computing the Kramers-Kronig transform,
 

where
 ,
 ,
 ,
 ,
 .

See also 
 Cauchy equation
 Sellmeier equation
 Lorentz oscillator model
 Forouhi–Bloomer model
 Brendel–Bormann oscillator model

References 

Condensed matter physics
Electric and magnetic fields in matter
Optics